A. indicus may refer to:

 Acinetobacter indicus, a species of bacterium isolated from a hexachlorocyclohexane dump site
 Aedes indicus, a species complex of zoophilic mosquito
 Agromyces indicus, a species of bacterium isolated from mangroves sediments
 Alectis indicus, the Indian threadfish, a fish species
 Amblyglyphidodon indicus, the pale damselfish, a dragonfly species
Anax indicus, a species of dragonfly
Ankistrodon indicus, an extinct species of archosauriform
 Anser indicus, the bar-headed goose, a goose species which breeds in Central Asia in colonies of thousands near mountain lakes

 Apristurus indicus, the smallbelly catshark, a shark species found in the western Indian Ocean
Armatophallus indicus, a species of twirler moth
Australentulus indicus, a species of proturan

Synonyms 
 Acrocephalus indicus, a heterotypic synonym of Platostoma hispidum
 Albicoccus indicus, a synonym of Abyssicoccus albus
Altererythrobacter indicus, a synonym of Altericroceibacterium indicum
Aspergillus indicus, a synonym of Aspergillus jaipurensis

See also
 Indicus (disambiguation)